Central Darfur State is one of the states of Sudan, and one of five comprising the Darfur region. It was created in January 2012 as a result of the ongoing peace process for the wider Darfur region. The state capital is Zalingei. The state was formed from land that had been part of the states of West Darfur and South Darfur.

Districts 

 Zalingei
 Azum
 Wadi Salih
 Mukjar
 Umm Dukhun
 Nertiti
 Rokirro
 Bindisi
 Kangey
 Soloa

References

States and territories established in 2012
States of Sudan